Dirk Knappheide (born 10 May 1967) is a German former modern pentathlete. He competed for West Germany at the 1988 Summer Olympics and for Germany at the 1992 Summer Olympics.

References

External links
 

1967 births
Living people
German male modern pentathletes
Olympic modern pentathletes of Germany
Olympic modern pentathletes of West Germany
Modern pentathletes at the 1988 Summer Olympics
Modern pentathletes at the 1992 Summer Olympics
People from Osnabrück (district)
Sportspeople from Lower Saxony